The 7th Africa Movie Academy Awards ceremony was held on 27 March 2011 at the Gloryland Cultural Center in Yenagoa, Bayelsa State, Nigeria, to honor the best African films of 2010. The nomination ceremony was held at the Ole Sereni Hotel in Nairobi, Kenya on 25 February 2011. For the films released in 2010, African Movie Academy Awards were presented in 26 categories.

Winners 
The winners of the 26 Award Categories are listed first and highlighted in bold letters.

Films with multiple nominations
The following films received multiple nominations.

12 nominations
Viva Riva!
9 nominations
Sinking Sands
8 nominations
Hopeville
 6 nominations
A Small Town Called Descent
Izulu Lami
5 nominations
Inale
Soul Boy
Shirley Adams
Tango With Me

4 nominations
Africa United
Maami
3 nominations
Aramotu
Mirror Boy
2 nominations
Anchor Baby
Pool Party
Yemoja
Zebu And The Photofish

References

Africa Movie Academy Awards
Africa Movie Academy Awards
Africa Movie Academy Awards ceremonies
Award
Africa Movie Academy Awards